Valle (Grand Canyon Junction) is a census-designated place in Coconino County, Arizona, United States. As of the 2010 US Census the population of Valle was 832. Its attractions include the Valle Airport (40G), the Planes of Fame Air Museum, and Birds of Prey formally Flintstones Bedrock City amusement park. Drivers often stop at the town on their way to the Grand Canyon from either Williams or Flagstaff, as it is approximately at the halfway point.

Demographics

Description 

Valle is not shown on the Rand McNally Road Atlas annual series.  The town sits  to the west of the highway intersections, with some streets to the east of US 180. The area is subdivided by roads for a planned community in which  lots were sold during the early 1960s. These roads are all dirt with the exception of the two main highways (US 180 and AZ 64). With the exception of a few property owners who have set up camp on their land, the area has not been developed.

Valle maintains no website. It has two main gas stations, several gift shops, and a small post office.

Attractions in Valle

Planes of Fame Museum

Bedrock City

Note: Bedrock City closed January 28, 2019.

See also
 Montoya Ranch of South Rim. Poultry and small livestock. Animal advocate and resources.

References

External links 
 Valle Area Plan (Coconino Co.)
 Planes of Fame Museum
 Valle Airport

Unincorporated communities in Coconino County, Arizona
Populated places established in the 1960s
Unincorporated communities in Arizona